Ambre McLean is a Canadian-born singer-songwriter based in Smiths Falls, Ontario. McLean is known for her live performances, versatile and distinct singing voice, cross-genre songwriting style and use of live looping technology. McLean's debut album Just Passing Through was released independently in 2004. Since then she has released three additional albums, two on respected indie label Busted Flat Records and her latest album "Me" on Northwood Records.

Canadian radio personality Alan Cross said of McLean in 2013 "I find her voice fantastically expressive" She was in the final eight competitors in the CBC competition for "Canada's Best New Artist".

Songs
"Missing You" spent 5 weeks on the FMQB Top 200 AC charts, peaking at No. 38. 
"Me, My Heart and The Moon" was the winner of the 2010 Ontario Council of Folk Festival's "Songs from the Heart" Award 
"So Over" reached the Top 8 in CBC's 2013 "Searchlight: The Hunt for Canada's Best New Artist" competition 
"Summon Me" featured in the feature film Neverlost
"I'll Be Home In Spring" featured on CBC's The Vinyl Cafe

Discography
2004 – Just Passing Through
2005 – Live at the Brasserie
2007 – I Wonder If...
2010 – Murder at the Smokehouse
2014 – Me
2017 - My Heart

References

External links 
 Ambre McLean

Year of birth missing (living people)
Living people
Canadian women singer-songwriters
Canadian folk singer-songwriters
Musicians from Guelph
People from Smiths Falls
Canadian singer-songwriters